Catawba is a town in Catawba County, North Carolina, United States. The population was 603 at the 2010 census. It is part of the Hickory–Lenoir–Morganton Metropolitan Statistical Area. As with the county, the name recalls the Catawba people, the indigenous people who once inhabited the area.

History
The Catawba Historic District, Alexander Moore Farm, Murray's Mill Historic District, and Powell–Trollinger Lime Kilns are listed on the National Register of Historic Places.

Geography
Catawba is located on the northeastern border of Catawba County at  (35.709853, -81.075734). Its northeastern boundary is the shore of the Catawba River in Lake Norman.

North Carolina Highway 10 passes through the center of the town, leading north  to Exit 138 on Interstate 40 and southwest  to Newton. U.S. Route 70 crosses NC 10 north of the center of Catawba and leads east  to Statesville and west  to Hickory.

Demographics

As of the census of 2010, there were 604 people, 270 households, and 208 families residing in the town. The population density was 262.6 people per square mile (117.7/km2). There were 285 housing units at an average density of 124.7 per square mile (48.1/km2). The racial makeup of the town was 65.90% White, 30.37% African American, 1.00% Asian, 2.15% from other races, and 0.57% from two or more races. Hispanic or Latino of any race were 5.59% of the population.

There were 270 households, out of which 25.9% had children under the age of 18 living with them, 55.6% were married couples living together, 17.0% had a female householder with no husband present, and 22.6% were non-families. 18.5% of all households were made up of individuals, and 8.5% had someone living alone who was 65 years of age or older. The average household size was 2.59 and the average family size was 2.93.

In the town, the population was spread out, with 22.9% under the age of 18, 7.6% from 18 to 24, 29.4% from 25 to 44, 22.6% from 45 to 64, and 17.5% who were 65 years of age or older. The median age was 38 years. For every 100 females, there were 83.7 males. For every 100 females age 18 and over, there were 83.0 males.

The median income for a household in the town was $42,031, and the median income for a family was $42,083. Males had a median income of $33,750 versus $21,645 for females. The per capita income for the town was $20,933. About 8.2% of families and 9.2% of the population were below the poverty line, including 12.6% of those under age 18 and 16.4% of those age 65 or over.

Notable people
 Shane Burton, former NFL player
 Justin Harper, former NFL player for the Baltimore Ravens
 Bryan Harvey, former MLB pitcher and 2x All-Star (1991, 1993)
 Hunter Harvey, MLB pitcher and son of Bryan Harvey
 Bobby Isaac, 1970 NASCAR Cup Series champion
 Vernon Lowrance, U.S. Navy vice admiral who was a decorated submarine commander during World War II
 Bobby Lutz, former head basketball coach at UNC-Charlotte
 Jeremy Mayfield, former NASCAR driver

References

Towns in Catawba County, North Carolina
North Carolina populated places on the Catawba River